Orff can refer to:

Carl Orff (1895–1982), a German composer, known for his teaching method, the Orff Schulwerk
Orff Schulwerk encompasses the Orff instruments and teaching methods for children
The Orff, a fictional alien species in K. A. Applegate's young adult book series, Animorphs

See also
 ORF (disambiguation)